King-Waldrop House, also known as Maple Grove, is a historic home located at Hendersonville, Henderson County, North Carolina. It was built about 1881, and is a two-story, frame dwelling with Italianate and Queen Anne style design elements.  It has a one-story rear section and a one-story wing.  It features a square three-stage cupola with a concave pyramidal roof and second floor wraparound porch.

It was listed on the National Register of Historic Places in 1989.

The King-Waldrop house is currently owned by the Waldrop Family.

References

Houses on the National Register of Historic Places in North Carolina
Italianate architecture in North Carolina
Queen Anne architecture in North Carolina
Houses completed in 1881
Houses in Henderson County, North Carolina
National Register of Historic Places in Henderson County, North Carolina
1881 establishments in North Carolina
Hendersonville, North Carolina